Paraguay competed at the 2004 Summer Olympics in Athens, Greece, from 13 to 29 August 2004. This was the nation's ninth appearance at the Olympics, except the 1980 Summer Olympics in Moscow because of its partial support to the United States boycott.

Comité Olímpico Paraguayo sent the nation's largest delegation to the Games since the 1992 Summer Olympics in Barcelona due to the presence of the men's football team. A total of 23 athletes, 21 men and 2 women, competed only in athletics, football, rowing, and swimming. The Paraguayan team featured two notable female athletes: javelin thrower Leryn Franco, who aspired to be one of the most beautiful women to compete at the Olympics because of her professional career as a model and beauty contestant, and single sculls rower Rocio Rivarola, aged seventeen, who later became the nation's first ever female flag bearer in the opening ceremony.

Paraguay left Athens with its first Olympic silver medal from the men's football team, following its defeat against Argentina with a score of 0–1 in the final match of the tournament.

Medalists

Athletics

Paraguayan athletes have so far achieved qualifying standards in the following athletics events (up to a maximum of 3 athletes in each event at the 'A' Standard, and 1 at the 'B' Standard).

Men
Track & road events

Women
Field events

Football

Men's tournament

Paraguay national football team faced a stiff test in order to qualify for the Athens Games, getting two goals in the last ten minutes to beat Chile, and edging Brazil to qualify out of South America, along with Argentina. On 4 August, before the Summer Olympics began, Paraguay measured against the Portugal of Cristiano Ronaldo in the city of Algarve, resulting in a 5–0 defeat.

Roster

Group play

Quarterfinals

Semifinals

Gold medal match

 Won silver medal

Rowing

Paraguayan rowers qualified the following boats:

Men

Women

Qualification Legend: FA=Final A (medal); FB=Final B (non-medal); FC=Final C (non-medal); FD=Final D (non-medal); FE=Final E (non-medal); FF=Final F (non-medal); SA/B=Semifinals A/B; SC/D=Semifinals C/D; SE/F=Semifinals E/F; R=Repechage

Swimming

Men

See also
 Paraguay at the 2003 Pan American Games

References

External links
Official Report of the XXVIII Olympiad
Paraguay Olympic Committee 

Nations at the 2004 Summer Olympics
2004
Summer Olympics